The Alliance PSD+PC was a center-left electoral alliance in Romania between 2008 and 2009.

History

Formation 

In continuation with the 2004 National Union PSD+PUR alliance, the new alliance was founded in 2008 between the Social Democratic Party (PSD) and the Conservative Party (PC), formerly Humanist Party of Romania (PUR) as a counterpart to the centre-right Justice and Truth Alliance (DA) between the National Liberal Party (PNL) and Democratic Party (PD).

2008 and 2009 elections 

It took part in the 2008 general elections and in the 2009 European Parliament election, with the alliance winning 11 seats, including one Conservatives' candidate: George Sabin Cutaş.

Dissolution 

In late 2010, the Alliance dissolved, as Conservative Party (PC) joined the National Liberal Party (PNL) to form the Centre Right Alliance (ACD).

Electoral history

Legislative elections 

Notes:

1 National Union PSD+PUR members: PSD (46 senators and 113 deputies) and PUR (11 senators and 19 deputies).

2 Soon after the elections, PUR broke the alliance and switched sides, joining the Justice and Truth Alliance (DA) in forming the government.

3 Alliance PSD+PC members: PSD (48 senators and 110 deputies) and PC (1 senator and 4 deputies).

European elections 

Notes:

1 Alliance PSD+PC members: PSD (10 MEPs) and PC (1 MEP).

References 

Defunct political party alliances in Romania